Drosera moorei is a scrambling or climbing perennial tuberous species in the carnivorous plant genus Drosera. It is endemic to Western Australia and grows near granite outcrops in sandy loam. Inflorescences have two to ten yellow flowers and bloom from September to October.

Drosera moorei was first described as a variety of D. subhirtella by Ludwig Diels in his 1906 monograph on the Droseraceae. In 1982, N. G. Marchant changed the variety to a subspecies and there the taxon stood until Allen Lowrie elevated it to species rank in 1999. It was originally named in honour of Spencer Le Marchant Moore, who worked for the Department of Botany at the British Museum and collected in Western Australia.

See also
List of Drosera species

References

Carnivorous plants of Australia
Caryophyllales of Australia
Eudicots of Western Australia
Plants described in 1906
moorei